Viktoriia Sergeyevna Lazarenko (born 25 March 2003) is a Russian freestyle skier.

She participated at the dual moguls at the FIS Freestyle Ski and Snowboarding World Championships 2021, winning a medal.

References

External links

Living people
2003 births
Russian female freestyle skiers
Olympic freestyle skiers of Russia
Freestyle skiers at the 2022 Winter Olympics
People from Chusovoy
Sportspeople from Perm Krai
21st-century Russian women